This is an alphabetical list of topics related to Zoroastrianism. This list is not complete, please add more to it as needed.



0-9
-

A
Ab-Zohr
Ahuna Vairya
Ahura Mazda
Ahura
Ameretat
Amesha Spenta
Angra Mainyu
Asha
Avesta
Avestan alphabet
Avestan geography
Avestan

B
Barashnûm
Barsom
Book of Arda Viraf
Bundahishn

C
Chihrdad

D
Daeva
Dakhma
Dastur
Denkard

E
-

F
Faravahar
Fire temple
Frashokereti
Fravashi

G
Gāh
Gathas

H
Haurvatat

I
-

J
Jamasp Namag

K
Kerman
Khordeh Avesta

L
-

M
Mahabad
Maneckji Nusserwanji Dhalla

N
Navjote

O
-

P
Parsi
Persecution of Zoroastrians

Q
Qissa-i Sanjan

R
-

S
Sad-dar
Sagdid
Saoshyant
Sasan
Sedreh
Sepandārmazgān

T
-

U
-

V
Vendidad
Visperad
Vohu Manah

W
-

X
Xerxes I

Y
Yashts
Yasna Haptanghaiti
Yasna
Yazata
Yazd

Z
Zend
Zoroaster
Zoroastrian calendar
Zoroastrian festivals
Zoroastrian music
Zoroastrian wedding
Zoroastrianism and sexual orientation
Zoroastrianism by Country
Zoroastrianism in Armenia
Zoroastrianism in Azerbaijan
Zoroastrians in Iran
Zurvanism

Zoroastrianism
Zoroastrianism
Zoroastrianism-related lists